Shive may refer to:

People
 Ian Shive, a nature and conservation photographer in Los Angeles, California
 John N. Shive, an American physicist and inventor (1913–1984)
 Madigan Shive, an American composer and musician from San Francisco, California

Other
 Shive, a fitting used in ale casks
 Shive (papermaking), incompletely cooked wood fibres in the pulp
 Shive, Texas, a small town in Hamilton County, Texas
 Shive wave machine, a device used to demonstrate wave mechanics